The Belgium–France border, or more commonly the Franco-Belgian border, separates France and Belgium and is  long. Part of it is defined by the Lys river. The western end is at the North Sea ( near De Panne and Bray-Dunes). The eastern end is at the Belgium–France–Luxembourg tripoint (at  near Athus and Mont-Saint-Martin).

Since 1995 Belgium and France have been parts of the Schengen Area. This means there are no permanent border controls at this border, but there have been temporary controls.

The Belgian side of the border is shared by, from north to south, the provinces of West Flanders (Flemish Region) and Hainaut, Namur and Luxembourg (Walloon Region).

The French side of the border is shared by, from north to south, the departments of Nord and Aisne (region of Hauts-de-France) and Ardennes, Meuse and Meurthe-et-Moselle (region of Grand Est).

The limits of the border are outlined in the 1820 Treaty of Kortrijk, agreed between France and the then-United Kingdom of the Netherlands. Belgium inherited the border upon its independence, which consists of a number of border posts. Maintenance of and disputes concerning the border are managed by a mixed Franco-Belgian border delimitation commission, which is convened when required. A commission was convened in 2000 concerning the maintenance of the border posts between France and the Belgian province of West Flanders.

On 4 May 2021, a Belgian farmer moved one of the border posts which was in the path of his tractor, inadvertently shifting the Belgian border approximately 2.2 metres (7.5 feet) into France.

See also
 Belgium–France relations

References

 
European Union internal borders
Borders of Belgium
Borders of France
International borders